The Ministry of Education is a ministry responsible for education in Egypt.

Ministers
 Hilmi Murad 1968–1969
 El Helali el Sherbini from September 2015
 Tarek Shawki from February 2017
 Reda Hegazy From August 2022

See also

 Cabinet of Egypt
List of Ministers of Education of Egypt

References

External links
Ministry of Education Official website
 Egypt's Cabinet Database

Education
Education in Egypt
Egypt